Freedom Is Frightening is a 1973 album by the Japanese percussionist, keyboardist and composer Stomu Yamash'ta and his band East Wind. It was recorded in August 1973 at Advision Studios (Gary Martin, engineer).

The cover art was designed by Saul Bass.

Critical reception
AllMusic called the title track "a master class in atmosphere and tension building, slowly expanding from the early long, sparse, foreboding electronica into progressive pyrotechnics."

Track listing

Side One 
 "Freedom Is Frightening"
 "Rolling Nun"

Side Two 
 "Pine On The Horizon"
 "Wind Words"

Personnel
Stomu Yamash'ta, Kit & Percussion 
Hisako Yamash'ta, Violin 
Hugh Hopper, Bass Guitar 
Gary Boyle, Electric & Acoustic Guitars 
Brian Gascoigne, Keyboards, Synthesizers, Vibraphone

See also
 The Man Who Fell To Earth (The movie includes tracks from Freedom is Frightening and other Yamash'ta albums.)

References

1973 albums
Island Records albums